Ammi trifoliatum is a species of flowering plant in the celery family Apiaceae, endemic to the Azores. It inhabits sloping areas, craters, ravines and Juniperus forests. It is native to seven of the nine islands.

References

Apioideae
Endemic flora of the Azores
Taxa named by William Trelease